Orplid is a neofolk, martial, post-industrial and experimental music group of German musicians, Uwe Nolte and Frank Machau. The name is drawn from the poem Gesang Weylas by Eduard Mörike, beginning ‘Du bist Orplid, mein Land’ ('You are Orplid, my land'). Orplid in the poem is a faraway fantasy land. The band has progressed over the course of their discography from acoustic folk peppered with instruments like the piano, organ, and cello, to a more experimental minimalistic style.

Discography

Albums and EPs

References

External links
 - Orplid
 - Uwe Nolte

Neofolk music groups